Hugo van den Berg is a Grand Prix motorcycle racer from the Netherlands.

Career statistics

By season

Races by year

References

External links
 Profile on motogp.com

1990 births
Living people
Dutch motorcycle racers
125cc World Championship riders
21st-century Dutch people